Konrad Kruis (11 May 1930 – 26 December 2022) was a German lawyer and judge. He served on the Federal Constitutional Court from 1987 to 1998.

Kruis died in Munich on 26 December 2022, at the age of 92.

References

1930 births
2022 deaths
Justices of the Federal Constitutional Court
German lawyers
Grand Crosses with Star and Sash of the Order of Merit of the Federal Republic of Germany
Ludwig Maximilian University of Munich alumni
People from Munich